Movin' On is an American drama television series. It ran for two seasons from 1974 to 1976 on the NBC network.

Synopsis
Movin' On stars Claude Akins as old-time independent "big-rig" truck driver Sonny Pruitt, and Frank Converse as his college-educated co-driver Will Chandler. The theme song, "Movin' On", was written and performed by Merle Haggard, and was a No. 1 single on the Billboard Hot Country Singles chart in July 1975.

The series was likened to Route 66 and Cannonball, following a similar format. Episodes usually centered on Sonny and Will, always traveling, becoming involved in the lives of people they met (or met again) in the various places they found themselves.

The pilot episode was a made-for-television movie originally titled In Tandem – a reference to the tandem axles on the tractor and trailer, as well as that they drove as a team, or "in tandem". The movie begins with Will sliding out of control in a truck he was driving, due to poor maintenance of the brakes.  After he manages to get the truck stopped, he drives to a truck stop and calls the company to quit his job.  He then meets Sonny, a "gypsy" trucker, and they decide to try driving as a team, which works out well.

The truck tractor featured on the pilot episode was a dark green 1973 Kenworth W-925, but was later changed to a 1974 model for the series run. Movin' On was filmed on location all over the United States, including Glen Burnie, Maryland; Mobile, Alabama; Sedona, Arizona; Phoenix, Arizona; San Diego and San Francisco, California; Buford and Jonesboro, Georgia; Durham and Charlotte, North Carolina; Astoria, Portland, The Dalles, Seaside and Hood River, Oregon; and Norfolk, Virginia. Parts of the series were also filmed in Salt Lake City, Heber and Midway, Utah.

Akins and Converse actually drove the trucks during filming, having been trained and obtaining their chauffeur's licenses (forerunner to the commercial driver's license) prior to making the pilot episode. Executive producers for the series were Barry Weitz and Philip D'Antoni. Akins later went on to appear in another trucking-related TV series, the more comedy-oriented B.J. and the Bear.

Episode list

Pilot (1974)
 "In Tandem" (May 8, 1974)

Season 1 (1974–1975)

Season 2 (1975–76)

Home media
On September 20, 2017, the first & second seasons of Movin' On were released on manufactured-on-demand DVD by Allied Vaughn & Pro Classic TV.

References in popular culture
The CB radio boom of the mid-1970s, figured into a merchandising tie-in for the show, and Movin' On-brand walkie-talkies, which worked on CB channel 14, were marketed to children.

During the series, truck drivers on the CB would say that they were going to "do it like Pruitt".  After the series ended, the phrase became "do it like Pruitt used to do it."  This phrase could still be heard occasionally 30 years later.

References

External links
 
 
 
 Movin' On web site - managed by the show's original producers with stories of production and many photo images

1974 American television series debuts
1976 American television series endings
1970s American drama television series
English-language television shows
NBC original programming
Television shows filmed in Utah
Television shows filmed in California
Television shows filmed in Georgia (U.S. state)
Television shows filmed in Oregon
Television shows filmed in North Carolina